Miss World 1978, the 28th edition of the Miss World pageant, was held on 16 November 1978 at the Royal Albert Hall in London, UK. The winner was Silvana Suárez from Argentina. She was crowned by Miss World 1977, Mary Stävin of Sweden. First runner-up was Ossie Margareta Carlsson representing Sweden, second runner-up was Denise Coward from Australia, third runner-up was Martha Eugenia Ortiz of Mexico, and fourth runner-up was Gloria Valenciano from Spain. This is the first time that the award for Miss Talent was given.This is the second time that Argentina to win Miss World.

Results

Placements

Contestants

Notes

Debuts

Returns
Last competed in 1970:
 
Last competed in 1975:
 
 
 
 
 
 
India, Malaysia, Mauritius, Philippines, and Swaziland were the contestants who withdrew in two consecutive pageants, Miss World 1976, and 1977, due to a protest against South Africa's participation.

Last competed in 1976:

Withdrawals
 This is the first time that  did not participate in Miss World due to being banned from the organization for the next 14 years.

References

Further reading
 The Milwaukee Journal. 15 November 1978.

External links
 Pageantopolis – Miss World 1978

Miss World
1978 in London
1978 beauty pageants
Beauty pageants in the United Kingdom
Events at the Royal Albert Hall
November 1978 events in the United Kingdom